William Feaver (born 1 December 1942) is a British art critic, curator, artist and lecturer.  From 1975–1998 he was the chief art critic of the Observer, and from 1994 a visiting professor at Nottingham Trent University.  His book The Pitmen Painters inspired the play of the same name by Lee Hall.

Education

Feaver was educated at Nottingham High School and Keble College, Oxford.  After graduating from Oxford he became a teacher at Newcastle's Royal Grammar School (1965–71) before being appointed the Sir James Knott Fellow at Newcastle University.  He is currently an academic board member of the Royal Drawing School.

Career as art critic

While at Newcastle, Feaver became the art critic of the Newcastle Journal before being appointed successively to the Listener (1971–75) and the Financial Times (1974–75) before being joining the Observer.  He won the Art Critic of the Year award in 1983. Feaver conducted an exemplary interview with Lucian Freud in 1992, The artist out of cage on Freud's 70th birthday, which has been re-published in English and German in the catalog of the Museum für Moderne Kunst Frankfurt exhibition Lucian Freud: Naked Portraits.

His 2019 book, The Lives of Lucian Freud, was shortlisted for the 2019 Baillie Gifford Prize.

Exhibitions curated

Feaver has curated a number of exhibitions in the UK and abroad, including:

 George Cruikshank, V&A, 1974
 Thirties, Hayward Gallery, 1979
 The Ashington Group, Beijing, 1979
 Lucian Freud exhibitions at Abbot Hall, Kendal (1996),Tate Britain and La Caixa, Barcelona (2002), Museum of Contemporary Art, Los Angeles (2002-3) and Museo Correr, Venice (2005)
 Michael Andrews, Tate Gallery, 2001
 John Constable, Grand Palais, 2002

Books published

 The Art of John Martin, 1975
 When We Were Young, 1976
 Masters of Caricature, 1981
 Pitmen Painters, 1988
 Frank Auerbach, 2009
 The Lives of Lucian Freud: Youth 1922–1968, 2019
 The Lives of Lucian Freud: Fame 1968-2011, 2020

Family

His father was the Rt Rev Douglas Feaver. In 1964 Feaver married Victoria Turton (the poet Vicki Feaver).  They had one son and three daughters.  He married, secondly, in 1985, Andrea Rose OBE; they have two daughters, Alice and Dorothy.

References

1942 births
Living people
People from Nottingham
People educated at Nottingham High School
Alumni of Keble College, Oxford
Academics of Newcastle University
Academics of Nottingham Trent University
English art critics
English male journalists
Financial Times people
The Observer people